Mijal Arantxa Hines Cuza (born December 15, 1993 in Heredia) is a volleyball and basketball player from Costa Rica, who played with the Costa Rica women's national volleyball team in the 2009 Women's Pan-American Volleyball Cup in Miami, Florida. There her team finished in 8th place. She also participated at the 2010 World Championship NORCECA Qualification Pool G, in Orlando, Florida, finishing in second place, and qualifying for the continental play-off. She uses the #16 jersey.

Basketball
In basketball, she participated in the COCABA U16 Championship for Women 2008.

Personal life
Her father is former Costa Rica national football team player César Hines.

Awards

Individuals
 2014 Central American and Caribbean Games "Best Middle Blocker"

References

External links
 FIVB profile
 FIBA profile

1993 births
Living people
People from Heredia Province
Costa Rican women's volleyball players
Costa Rican women's basketball players

Central American and Caribbean Games bronze medalists for Costa Rica
Competitors at the 2010 Central American and Caribbean Games
Central American and Caribbean Games medalists in volleyball